It's Personal is the first studio album by Tina Campbell. Gee Tree Creative released the album on May 21, 2015.

Critical reception

Awarding the album three and a half stars from AllMusic, David Jeffries states, "Released in the era of early leaks for albums, Tina Campbell's solo debut made news when it actually missed its street date, but that's the only stumble made by this 2015 release, as Mary Mary fans will likely embrace this solid splinter effort." Tony Cummings, giving the album a nine out of ten at Cross Rhythms, writes, "The album closes with Tina literally praying over a piano backing and all but the most jaundiced of listeners will be moved by a brave, and deeply personal, album." Tina was awarded an NAACP Image Awards for her debut one for Outstanding Gospel Album and two Stellar awards  for Traditional Female Vocalist and Traditional CD of the Year.

Track listing

Chart performance

References

2015 debut albums